Alexandru-Viorel Șimicu (born 8 October 1988, in Timișoara) is a Romanian handballer playing for Saint-Raphaël Var Handball as a left back.
Șimicu ranked second in the 2013–14 EHF Cup's top goalscorers list.

Achievements
Liga Națională:
Winner: 2012, 2013, 2014
Cupa României:
Winner: 2012, 2013, 2014
Supercupa României:
Winner: 2013
EHF Cup:
Finalist: 2015
Fourth place: 2014
France Division 1:
Runner-up: 2016

Individual awards
 Romanian Handballer of the Year: 2013

References

1988 births
Living people
Sportspeople from Timișoara
Romanian male handball players
HC Dobrogea Sud Constanța players 
Romanian expatriates in Germany
Expatriate handball players